Dauði Baldrs (Old Norse for "Baldr's Death" or "The Death of Baldr") is the fifth album by the Norwegian solo act Burzum. Unlike Burzum's previous work, which was mostly black metal, this is a dark ambient album. It was recorded using a synthesizer and a normal tape recorder by Varg Vikernes while he was in prison, as he was not allowed to have any other instruments or recording equipment. It was completed in a few months due to his limited access to synthesizers, which was also the case with the following album, Hliðskjálf.

Concept
The album is about the legacy of Baldr, the second son of Odin in Norse mythology. Most likely a concept album, as the whole album leads up to Ragnarök, the battle at the end of the world in Norse mythology.

Music
Stylistically, the album is a mix of medieval music, ambient, neoclassical and minimalism, a distinct change from the raw black metal that characterized Burzum's earlier work. Some songs are very folk-driven and medieval, while some are sparse, hypnotic, ambient minimalist songs, particularly "Illa tiðandi". The album has been described by many as "dungeon synth". "Móti Ragnarokum" contains monophonic sections mixed with other thicker sections. "Illa tiðandi" is easily the most minimalist track, with only two sections being repeated over the 10:29 duration, which are both simple piano melodies, eventually accompanied by a choral chant.

"Illa tiðandi" is an alternative version of the song "Decrepitude I", while "Bálferð Baldrs" is an ambient version of the main riff from the song "Jesu død". "Moti Ragnarokum" is an extended, ambient version of the song "Mace Attack". Two of these songs appeared on Burzum's previous album Filosofem.

The song "Dauði Baldrs" was later re-arranged into a black metal style as the song "Belus død" on the 2010 album Belus, although it was composed in the 90s on "Wotans Verhängnis" and remained unreleased.

Name and release
The album was originally named Balders Død. The Misanthropy promo CD sent out before the album's release had this title, as well as a different cover. Furthermore, some copies of the album have a misprint of the Burzum logo, spelling it "Burzu". Rare original pressings of the LP include an eight-page booklet with artwork and Norwegian text as well as a set of six tarot cards. The swastika-adorned cloak worn by a man on the cover is an almost exact copy of the cloak worn by the character Thordur in When the Raven Flies.

Reception

Sputnik Music gave the album a 1.5 out of 5 review, saying it's "40 minutes of a crazed neo-Nazi, church-burning murderer playing a toy piano. It's only half as funny as it sounds."

Track listing
All tracks by Varg Vikernes.

Credits
Varg Vikernes – synthesizers, audio engineering, songwriting
Pytten – mastering

Notes

External links
Burzum discography

1997 albums
Burzum albums